Entry of Christ into Jerusalem is a 1617 oil painting by Flemish artist Anthony van Dyck, located in the Indianapolis Museum of Art, which is in Indianapolis, Indiana. It depicts Jesus entering Jerusalem as described in the Gospels, the event celebrated on Palm Sunday.

Description
Van Dyck's presentation of Jesus' entry into Jerusalem is quite consistent with the biblical accounts. The ass foal he rides is almost entirely enveloped by his robes of rich blue and crimson. He is surrounded by his disciples on foot, and jubilantly welcomed by a crowd of locals who lay branches in his path. It is a very youthful, vigorous work, full of bright colors and slashing brushstrokes. The restlessness and muscularity of the figures are very Baroque. The naturalism and large size of figures gives them tremendous immediacy, lending drama to the narrative.

Historical information
Painted when van Dyck was only about 18, Entry of Christ into Jerusalem demonstrates his early mastery of the medium. He was already Peter Paul Rubens' principal assistant. While already working on developing his own, more robust style, van Dyck was heavily influenced by Rubens, as can be seen in the vibrant colors, dynamic composition, and grand scale.

Exhibition history
From November 2012 to March 2013, this painting was on display at the Prado as part of an exhibit called "The Young van Dyck." Covering his output from ages 16 to 22, this exhibit collected some 90 artworks from when he resided in Antwerp. This tally included 30 large, ambitious artworks like Entry of Christ into Jerusalem. This particular work, though, was noted as one of his most experimental, as the young artist sought to heighten the visual impact of his works.

Acquisition
Entry of Christ into Jerusalem was purchased by Mr. and Mrs. Herman C. Krannert in 1958 as a gift for the Herron School of Art, which later evolved, in part, into the IMA. It is currently on view in the William C. Griffith Jr. and Carolyn C. Griffith Gallery and has the accession number 58.3.

See also 
 Triumphal entry into Jerusalem
 Entry of Christ into Jerusalem (Master of Taüll)

References

External links
IMA page. 
The Young van Dyck

Paintings in the collection of the Indianapolis Museum of Art
1617 paintings
Religious paintings by Anthony van Dyck
Paintings depicting the Passion of Jesus
Donkeys in art